For televisions the picture line-up generation equipment (PLUGE or pluge) is the greyscale test patterns used in order to adjust the black level and contrast of the picture monitor. Various PLUGE patterns can be generated, the most common consisting of three vertical bars of super-black, normal black, and near-black and two rectangles of mid-gray and white (sometimes these are measured in IRE). These three PLUGE pulses are included in the SMPTE color bars (at the bottom and near the right) used for NTSC, PAL, and SÉCAM.

External links 
 

Television technology